Norr-Hede is a locality situated in Härjedalen Municipality, Jämtland County, Sweden with 261 inhabitants in 2010.

References 

Populated places in Härjedalen Municipality
Härjedalen